The Volvo P80 platform was a Swedish mid-size unibody automobile platform developed and produced by Volvo Cars. It was in use from 1991 to 2005. It is designed for different wheelbases in front-wheel drive configurations and was adapted to all wheel drive. It debuted with the 1991 Volvo 850. Although heavily modified by TWR, the same basic chassis was used as the underpinnings for the C70. After the model year 2000 most P80 models were replaced by their P2 successors, with the exception of the C70 convertible which remained in production until 2005. A total of 1,360,522 cars based on this platform were built.

The platform utilises a front engine transaxle design with engines and gearboxes mounted transversely on a subframe. Only straight 5 engines were offered. A front subframe and front MacPherson struts were used and either Volvo's patented Deltalink rear axle on FWD models or Volvo's Multi-Link rear suspension with an independent rear subframe on AWD models.

Vehicles

References

1991 introductions
P80